Fadi Lafi Abu Lattifa (born 23 March 1979) is a Palestinian footballer, who currently plays as a forward for Hilal Al-Quds.

International

International goals
Scores and results list Palestine's goal tally first.

References

External links
 
 Kooora.com

1979 births
Living people
Palestinian footballers
Palestine international footballers
Association football midfielders
Palestinian expatriate footballers
Expatriate footballers in Jordan
Palestinian expatriate sportspeople in Jordan
Al-Faisaly SC players
Footballers at the 2002 Asian Games
Asian Games competitors for Palestine